Le Petit Nicolas is a 2009 3D animated TV series based on the character Le petit Nicolas by René Goscinny and Jean-Jacques Sempé. The series was a success especially in attracting young viewers. Two seasons of this TV series have since been broadcast.

Voices in English

Voices in French 
 Valentin Maupin: Nicolas
 Robin Trouffier: Alceste
 Clara Do Espirito: Louisette
 Sauvane Delanoë: Clotaire
 Céline Ronté: Eudes
 Fily Keita: Geoffroy
 Hervé Rey: Agnan
 Laurence Dourlens: the mother of Nicolas
 Bruno Magne: the father of Nicolas
 Marie-Eugénie Maréchal: the teachers
 Xavier Fagnon: Le Bouillon (Old Spuds)

References

External links 

2009 French television series debuts
2010 French television series endings
2000s French animated television series
2010s French animated television series
French children's animated comedy television series
French computer-animated television series
French television shows based on children's books
Television series based on short fiction
Television series based on French comics
Television series set in the 1950s
Television shows set in France
Television series by Method Animation